Albert Harland (6 September 1869 – 25 February 1957) was a British Conservative Party politician.

After studying at Temple Grove in East Sheen and Corpus Christi College, Cambridge, Harland moved to Sheffield, where he set up as a snuff manufacturer.

In 1902, he was elected to Sheffield County Borough Council, serving until 1911.  In 1923, he was re-elected to the Council, and also as the Member of Parliament for Sheffield Ecclesall.  He stood down from the Council but held the Parliamentary seat in 1924.  In 1929, Harland moved to stand for Sheffield Hillsborough, but was unable to gain the seat.  He was elected to the council for a third period, serving on this occasion until 1936.

References

External links 
 

1869 births
1957 deaths
Alumni of Corpus Christi College, Cambridge
Conservative Party (UK) MPs for English constituencies
Politics of Sheffield
UK MPs 1923–1924
UK MPs 1924–1929
Councillors in Sheffield